Dishmok (also Romanized as Dīshmok; also known as Dīshmook and Dīshmūk) is a city in and the capital of Dishmok District, in Kohgiluyeh County, Kohgiluyeh and Boyer-Ahmad Province, Iran. At the 2006 census, its population was 4,053, in 710 families.

References

Populated places in Kohgiluyeh County

Cities in Kohgiluyeh and Boyer-Ahmad Province